Caashia Karringten (born 24 October 1992) is field hockey player from Canada. Karringten plays as a striker in the Canada national team and made her international debut for Canada in 2012.

Playing career

Senior National Team
In 2013, Karringten was a member of the Canada squad at the 2013 Pan American Cup in Mendoza, Argentina, where the team won bronze.

Karringten was a member of the bronze medal winning Canada team at the 2015 Pan American Games. This was Canada's first medal in the event since 1999.

Junior National Team
Karringten has also represented Canada's junior national team, including at the 2013 Junior World Cup in Mönchengladbach, Germany, where the team finished in fourteenth place.

References

1992 births
Living people
Canadian female field hockey players
Field hockey players from Vancouver
Pan American Games medalists in field hockey
Pan American Games bronze medalists for Canada
Field hockey players at the 2015 Pan American Games
Medalists at the 2015 Pan American Games